Tacrine is a centrally acting acetylcholinesterase inhibitor and indirect cholinergic agonist (parasympathomimetic). It was the first centrally acting cholinesterase inhibitor approved for the treatment of Alzheimer's disease, and was marketed under the trade name Cognex. Tacrine was first synthesised by Adrien Albert at the University of Sydney in 1949. It also acts as a histamine N-methyltransferase inhibitor.

Clinical use
Tacrine was the prototypical cholinesterase inhibitor for the treatment of Alzheimer's disease. William K. Summers received a patent for this use in 1989.  Studies found that it may have a small beneficial effect on cognition and other clinical measures, though study data was limited and the clinical relevance of these findings was unclear.

Tacrine has been discontinued in the US in 2013, due to concerns over safety.

Tacrine was also described as an analeptic agent used to promote mental alertness.

Adverse Effects
Very common (>10% incidence) adverse effects include
 Increased liver function tests (LFT)
 Nausea
 Vomiting
 Diarrhea
 Headache
 Dizziness

Common (1-10% incidence) adverse effects include
 Indigestion
 Belching
 Abdominal pain
 Myalgia — muscle pain
 Confusion
 Ataxia — decreased control over bodily movements.
 Insomnia
 Rhinitis
 Rash
 Fatigue
 Weight loss
 Constipation
 Somnolence
 Tremor
 Anxiety
 Urinary incontinence
 Hallucinations
 Agitation
 Conjunctivitis (a link to tacrine treatment has not been conclusively proven)
 Diaphoresis — sweating.

Uncommon/rare (<1% incidence) adverse effects include
 Hepatotoxicity (that is toxic effects on the liver)
 Ototoxicity (hearing/ear damage; a link to tacrine treatment has not been conclusively proven)
 Seizures
 Agranulocytosis (a link between treatment and this adverse effect has not been proven) — a potentially fatal drop in white blood cells, the body's immune/defensive cells. 
 Taste changes

Unknown incidence adverse effects include
 Urinary tract infection
 Delirium
 Other optic effects such as glaucoma, cataracts, etc. (also not conclusively linked to tacrine treatment)
 Depression
 Suicidal ideation and behaviour
 Hypotension
 Bradycardia

Overdose 
As stated above, overdosage of tacrine may give rise to severe side effects such as nausea, vomiting, salivation, sweating, bradycardia, hypotension, collapse, and convulsions. Atropine is a popular treatment for overdose.

Pharmacokinetics
Major form of metabolism is in the liver via hydroxylation of benzylic carbon by CYP1A2. This forms the major metabolite 1-hydroxy-tacrine (velnacrine) which is still active.

References

External links
Acetylcholinesterase: A gorge-ous enzyme QUite Interesting PDB Structure article at PDBe

Acetylcholinesterase inhibitors
Antidementia agents